Pierreville is a municipality in Nicolet-Yamaska Regional County Municipality, Quebec, located at the confluence of the Saint Lawrence and Saint-François rivers, at the edge of Lac Saint-Pierre. The population as of the Canada 2011 Census was 2,176.

Pierreville faces the town of Saint-François-du-Lac across the Saint-François river, and lies at the junction of Route 132 and Route 226. Part of the Abenaki Indian reserve of Odanak is an enclave within the city limits of Pierreville. The limits of the reserve begin only a short walk away from the town's main street.

History
On 21 August 1991, an F3 tornado, the "tornade de Maskinongé", touched down in Notre-Dame-de-Pierreville (today part of Pierreville), destroying a number of summer homes in the area and injuring 15 people.

On June 13, 2001, the parish municipalities of Notre-Dame-de-Pierreville and Saint-Thomas-de-Pierreville merged with the village municipality of Pierreville to form the new municipality of Pierreville.

Economy

Manufacturing
Pierreville is a major centre for the manufacture of fire trucks. Local builder Pierre Thibault Canada Ltee. built fire apparatus in Pierreville from 1938 to 1990. In 1968, members of the Thibault family established a competing business, Pierreville Fire Trucks, across the river in Saint-François-du-Lac. It operated until 1985. Levasseur Fire Trucks also built fire apparatus in Saint-François-du-Lac from 1988 to 2014. Today, Carl Thibault Fire Trucks operates in the former Pierre Thibault facility in Pierreville.

During the visit of Pope John Paul II to Canada in 1984, Pierre Thibault modified a GMC Sierra truck for use as a Popemobile, a secure form of transport built to withstand a commando attack. It was subsequently used for the 1998 papal visit to Cuba and was displayed at the Canada Museum of Science and Technology in 2005. The second truck was sent back to the Vatican in 1984.

Agriculture
Like the rest of the Centre-du-Quebec region, agriculture plays an important role in Pierreville's economy, with a number of dairy, vegetable, grain and other farms based in the area.

Demographics

Population
Population trend:

(+) Amalgamation of the Parishes of Notre-Dame-de-Pierreville, Saint-Thomas-de-Pierreville, and the Village of Pierreville on June 13, 2001.

Language
Mother tongue language (2006)

Climate

See also
 List of municipalities in Quebec
 Municipal history of Quebec

References

External links
 

Municipalities in Quebec
Incorporated places in Centre-du-Québec
Quebec populated places on the Saint Lawrence River
Nicolet-Yamaska Regional County Municipality